Gothic architecture (or pointed architecture) is an architectural style that was prevalent in Europe from the late 12th to the 16th century, during the High and Late Middle Ages, surviving into the 17th and 18th centuries in some areas. It evolved from Romanesque architecture and was succeeded by Renaissance architecture. It originated in the Île-de-France and Picardy regions of northern France. The style at the time was sometimes known as opus Francigenum; the term Gothic was first applied contemptuously during the later Renaissance, by those ambitious to revive the architecture of classical antiquity.

The defining design element of Gothic architecture is the pointed or ogival arch. The use of the pointed arch in turn led to the development of the pointed rib vault and flying buttresses, combined with elaborate tracery and stained glass windows.

At the Abbey of Saint-Denis, near Paris, the choir was reconstructed between 1140 and 1144, drawing together for the first time the developing Gothic architectural features. In doing so, a new architectural style emerged that emphasized verticality and the effect created by the transmission of light through stained glass windows.

Common examples are found in  Christian ecclesiastical architecture, and Gothic cathedrals and churches, as well as abbeys, and parish churches. It is also the architecture of many castles, palaces, town halls, guildhalls, universities and, less prominently today, private dwellings. Many of the finest examples of medieval Gothic architecture are listed with UNESCO as World Heritage Sites.

With the development of Renaissance architecture in Italy during the mid 15th century, the Gothic style was supplanted by the new style, but in some regions, notably England and Belgium, Gothic continued to flourish and develop into the 16th century. A series of Gothic revivals began in mid-18th century England, spread through 19th-century Europe and continued, largely for churches and university buildings, into the 20th century.

Name 

Gothic architecture is also known as pointed architecture or ogival architecture.

The term "Gothic architecture" originated as a pejorative description. Giorgio Vasari used the term "barbarous German style" in his Lives of the Artists to describe what is now considered the Gothic style, and in the introduction to the Lives he attributes various architectural features to the Goths, whom he held responsible for destroying the ancient buildings after they conquered Rome, and erecting new ones in this style. When Vasari wrote, Italy had experienced a century of building in the Vitruvian architectural vocabulary of classical orders revived in the Renaissance and seen as evidence of a new Golden Age of learning and refinement. Thus the Gothic style, being in opposition to classical architecture, from that point of view was associated with the destruction of advancement and sophistication. The assumption that classical architecture was better than Gothic architecture was widespread and proved difficult to defeat. Vasari was echoed in the 16th century by François Rabelais, who referred to Goths and Ostrogoths (Gotz and Ostrogotz).

The polymath architect Christopher Wren disapproved of the name Gothic for pointed architecture. He compared it to Islamic architecture, which he called the 'Saracen style', pointing out that the pointed arch's sophistication was not owed to the Goths but to the Islamic Golden Age. He wrote:

Wren was the first to popularize the belief that it was not the Europeans, but the Saracens that had created the Gothic style. The term ‘Saracen’ was still in use in the 18th century and it typically referred to all Muslims, including the Arabs and Berbers. Wren mentions Europe's architectural debt to the Saracens no fewer than twelve times in his writings. He also decidedly broke with tradition in his assumption that Gothic architecture did not merely represent a violent and bothersome mistake, as suggested by Vasari. Rather, he saw that the Gothic style had developed over time along the lines of a changing society, and that it was thus a legitimate architectural style in and of its own.

It was no secret that Wren strongly disliked the building practices of the Gothic style. When he was appointed Surveyor of the Fabric at Westminster Abbey in the year 1698, he expressed his distaste for the Gothic style in a letter to the bishop of Rochester:

The chaos of the Gothic left much to be desired in Wren's eyes. His aversion of the style was so strong that he refused to put a Gothic roof on the new St. Paul's, despite being pressured to do so.  Wren much preferred symmetry and straight lines in architecture, which is why he constantly praised the classic architecture of ‘the Ancients’ in his writings.

Even though he openly expressed his distaste for the Gothic style, Wren did not blame the Saracens for the apparent lack of ingenuity. Quite the opposite: he praised the Saracens for their 'superior' vaulting techniques and their widespread use of the pointed arch. Wren claimed the inventors of the Gothic had seen the Saracen architecture during the Crusades, also called the Religious war or Holy War, organised by the Kingdom of France in the year 1095:

There are several chronological issues that arise with this statement, which is one of the reasons why Wren's theory is rejected by many. The earliest examples of the pointed arch in Europe date from before the Holy War in the year 1095; this is widely regarded as proof that the Gothic style could not have possibly been derived from Saracen architecture. Several authors have taken a stance against this allegation, claiming that the Gothic style had most likely filtered into Europe in other ways, for example through Spain or Sicily. The Spanish architecture from the Moors could have influenced the emergence Gothic style long before the Crusades took place. This could have happened gradually through merchants, travelers and pilgrims.

According to a 19th-century correspondent in the London journal Notes and Queries, Gothic was a derisive misnomer; the pointed arcs and architecture of the later Middle Ages was quite different from the rounded arches prevalent in late antiquity and the period of the Ostrogothic Kingdom in Italy:There can be no doubt that the term 'Gothic' as applied to pointed styles of ecclesiastical architecture was used at first contemptuously, and in derision, by those who were ambitious to imitate and revive the Grecian orders of architecture, after the revival of classical literature. But, without citing many authorities, such as Christopher Wren, and others, who lent their aid in depreciating the old mediaeval style, which they termed Gothic, as synonymous with every thing that was barbarous and rude, it may be sufficient to refer to the celebrated Treatise of Sir Henry Wotton, entitled The Elements of Architecture, ... printed in London so early as 1624. ... But it was a strange misapplication of the term to use it for the pointed style, in contradistinction to the circular, formerly called Saxon, now Norman, Romanesque, &c. These latter styles, like Lombardic, Italian, and the Byzantine, of course belong more to the Gothic period than the light and elegant structures of the pointed order which succeeded them.

Influences 

The Gothic style of architecture was strongly influenced by the Romanesque architecture which preceded it; by the growing population and wealth of European cities, and by the desire to express local grandeur. It was also influenced by theological doctrines which called for more light and by technical improvements in vaults and buttresses that allowed much greater height and larger windows. It was also influenced by the necessity of many churches, such as Chartres Cathedral and Canterbury Cathedral, to accommodate growing numbers of pilgrims. It also adapted features from earlier styles, such as Islamic architecture. According to Charles Texier (French historian,  architect, and archaeologist) and Josef Strzygowski (Polish-Austrian art historian), after lengthy research and study of cathedrals in the medieval city of Ani, the capital of the medieval kingdom of Armenia concluded to have discovered the oldest Gothic arch. According to these historians, the architecture of the Saint Hripsime Church near the Armenian religious seat Etchmiadzin was built in the fourth century A.D. and was repaired in 618. The cathedral of Ani was built in 980-1012 A.D. However many of the elements of Islamic and Armenian architecture that have been cited as influences on Gothic architecture also appeared in Late Roman and Byzantine architecture, the most noticeable example being the pointed arch and flying buttress. Byzantine architecture was one of the most important influences on Gothic architecture. The greatest example being the capitals that broke away from the Classical conventions of ancient Greek and Rome with sinuous lines and naturalistic forms, which are precursors to the Gothic style.

Periods 
Architecture "became a leading form of artistic expression during the late Middle Ages". Gothic architecture began in the earlier 12th century in northwest France and England and spread throughout Latin Europe in the 13th century; by 1300, a first "international style" of Gothic had developed, with common design features and formal language. A second "international style" emerged by 1400, alongside innovations in England and central Europe that produced both the perpendicular and flamboyant varieties. Typically, these typologies are identified as:

 c.1130–c.1240 Early to High Gothic and Early English
 c.1240–c.1350 Rayonnant and Decorated Style
 c.1350–c.1500 Late Gothic: flamboyant and perpendicular

History

Early Gothic 
Norman architecture on either side of the English Channel developed in parallel towards Early Gothic. Gothic features, such as the rib vault, had appeared in England and Normandy in the 11th century. Rib-vaults were employed in some parts of the cathedral at Durham (1093–) and in Lessay Abbey in Normandy (1098). However, the first buildings to be considered fully Gothic are the royal funerary abbey of the French kings, the Abbey of Saint-Denis (1134–44), and the archiepiscopal cathedral at Sens (1143–63) They were the first buildings to systematically combine rib vaulting, buttresses, and pointed arches. Most of the characteristics of later Early English were already present in the lower chevet of Saint-Denis.

The Duchy of Normandy, part of the Angevin Empire until the 13th century, developed its own version of Gothic. One of these was the Norman chevet, a small apse or chapel attached to the choir at the east end of the church, which typically had a half-dome. The lantern tower was another common feature in Norman Gothic. One example of early Norman Gothic is Bayeux Cathedral (1060–70) where the Romanesque cathedral nave and choir were rebuilt into the Gothic style. Lisieux Cathedral was begun in 1170. Rouen Cathedral (begun 1185) was rebuilt from Romanesque to Gothic with distinct Norman features, including a lantern tower, deeply moulded decoration, and high pointed arcades. Coutances Cathedral was remade into Gothic beginning about 1220. Its most distinctive feature is the octagonal lantern on the crossing of the transept, decorated with ornamental ribs, and surrounded by sixteen bays and sixteen lancet windows.

Saint-Denis was the work of the Abbot Suger, a close adviser of Kings Louis VI and Louis VII. Suger reconstructed portions of the old Romanesque church with the rib vault in order to remove walls and to make more space for windows. He described the new ambulatory as "a circular ring of chapels, by virtue of which the whole church would shine with the wonderful and uninterrupted light of most luminous windows, pervading the interior beauty." To support the vaults He also introduced columns with capitals of carved vegetal designs, modelled upon the classical columns he had seen in Rome. In addition, he installed a circular rose window over the portal on the façade. These also became a common feature of Gothic cathedrals.

Some elements of Gothic style appeared very early in England. Durham Cathedral was the first cathedral to employ a rib vault, built between 1093 and 1104. The first cathedral built entirely in the new style was Sens Cathedral, begun between 1135 and 1140 and consecrated in 1160. Sens Cathedral features a Gothic choir, and six-part rib vaults over the nave and collateral aisles, alternating pillars and doubled columns to support the vaults, and buttresses to offset the outward thrust from the vaults. One of the builders who is believed to have worked on Sens Cathedral, William of Sens, later travelled to England and became the architect who, between 1175 and 1180, reconstructed the choir of Canterbury Cathedral in the new Gothic style.

Sens Cathedral was influential in its strongly vertical appearance and in its three-part elevation, typical of subsequent Gothic buildings, with a clerestory at the top supported by a triforium, all carried on high arcades of pointed arches. In the following decades flying buttresses began to be used, allowing the construction of lighter, higher walls. French Gothic churches were heavily influenced both by the ambulatory and side-chapels around the choir at Saint-Denis, and by the paired towers and triple doors on the western façade.

Sens was quickly followed by Senlis Cathedral (begun 1160), and Notre-Dame de Paris (begun 1160). Their builders abandoned the traditional plans and introduced the new Gothic elements from Saint-Denis. The builders of Notre-Dame went further by introducing the flying buttress, heavy columns of support outside the walls connected by arches to the upper walls. The buttresses counterbalanced the outward thrust from the rib vaults. This allowed the builders to construct higher, thinner walls and larger windows.

Early English and High Gothic

Following the destruction by fire of the choir of Canterbury Cathedral in 1174, a group of master builders was invited to propose plans for the reconstruction. The master-builder William of Sens, who had worked on Sens Cathedral, won the competition. Work began that same year, but in 1178 William was badly injured by fall from the scaffolding, and returned to France, where he died. His work was continued by William the Englishman who replaced his French namesake in 1178. The resulting structure of the choir of Canterbury Cathedral is considered the first work of Early English Gothic. The cathedral churches of Worcester (1175–), Wells (c.1180–), Lincoln (1192–), and Salisbury (1220–) are all, with Canterbury, major examples. Tiercerons – decorative vaulting ribs – seem first to have been used in vaulting at Lincoln Cathedral, installed c.1200. Instead of a triforium, Early English churches usually retained a gallery.

High Gothic (c. 1194–1250) was a brief but very productive period, which produced some of the great landmarks of Gothic art. The first building in the High Gothic was Chartres Cathedral, an important pilgrimage church south of Paris. The Romanesque cathedral was destroyed by fire in 1194, but was swiftly rebuilt in the new style, with contributions from King Philip II of France, Pope Celestine III, local gentry, merchants, craftsmen, and Richard the Lionheart, king of England. The builders simplified the elevation used at Notre Dame, eliminated the tribune galleries, and used flying buttresses to support the upper walls. The walls were filled with stained glass, mainly depicting the story of the Virgin Mary but also, in a small corner of each window, illustrating the crafts of the guilds who donated those windows.

The model of Chartres was followed by a series of new cathedrals of unprecedented height and size. These were Reims Cathedral (begun 1211), where coronations of the kings of France took place; Amiens Cathedral (1220–1226); Bourges Cathedral (1195–1230) (which, unlike the others, continued to use six-part rib vaults); and Beauvais Cathedral (1225–).

In central Europe, the High Gothic style appeared in the Holy Roman Empire, first at Toul (1220–), whose Romanesque cathedral was rebuilt in the style of Reims Cathedral; then Trier's Liebfrauenkirche parish church (1228–), and then throughout the Reich, beginning with the Elisabethkirche at Marburg (1235–) and the cathedral at Metz (c.1235–).

In High Gothic, the whole surface of the clerestory was given over to windows. At Chartres Cathedral, plate tracery was used for the rose window, but at Reims the bar-tracery was free-standing. Lancet windows were supplanted by multiple lights separated by geometrical bar-tracery. Tracery of this kind distinguishes Middle Pointed style from the simpler First Pointed. Inside, the nave was divided into by regular bays, each covered by a quadripartite rib vaults.

Other characteristics of the High Gothic were the development of rose windows of greater size, using bar-tracery, higher and longer flying buttresses, which could reach up to the highest windows, and walls of sculpture illustrating biblical stories filling the façade and the fronts of the transept. Reims Cathedral had two thousand three hundred statues on the front and back side of the façade.

The new High Gothic churches competed to be the tallest, with increasingly ambitious structures lifting the vault yet higher. Attention turned from achieving greater height to creating more awe-inspiring decoration.

Rayonnant Gothic and Decorated Style 

Rayonnant Gothic maximized the coverage of stained glass windows such that the walls are effectively entirely glazed; examples are the nave of Saint-Denis (1231–) and the royal chapel of Louis IX of France on the Île de la Cité in the Seine – the Sainte-Chapelle (c.1241–8). The high and thin walls of French Rayonnant Gothic allowed by the flying buttresses enabled increasingly ambitious expanses of glass and decorated tracery, reinforced with ironwork. Shortly after Saint-Denis, in the 1250s, Louis IX commissioned the rebuilt transepts and enormous rose windows of Notre-Dame de Paris (1250s for the north transept, 1258 for the beginning of south transept). This first 'international style' was also used in the clerestory of Metz Cathedral (c.1245–), then in the choir of Cologne's cathedral (c.1250–), and again in the nave of the cathedral at Strasbourg (c.1250–). Masons elaborated a series of tracery patterns for windows – from the basic geometrical to the reticulated and the curvilinear – which had superseded the lancet window. Bar-tracery of the curvilinear, flowing, and reticulated types distinguish Second Pointed style.

Decorated Gothic similarly sought to emphasize the windows, but excelled in the ornamentation of their tracery. Churches with features of this style include Westminster Abbey (1245–), the cathedrals at Lichfield (after 1257–) and Exeter (1275–), Bath Abbey (1298–), and the retro choir at Wells Cathedral (c.1320–).

The Rayonnant developed its second 'international style' with increasingly autonomous and sharp-edged tracery mouldings apparent in the cathedral at Clermont-Ferrand (1248–), the papal collegiate church at Troyes, Saint-Urbain (1262–), and the west façade of Strasbourg Cathedral (1276–1439)). By 1300, there were examples influenced by Strasbourg in the cathedrals of Limoges (1273–), Regensburg (c.1275–), and in the cathedral nave at York (1292–).

Late Gothic: flamboyant and perpendicular 

Central Europe began to lead the emergence of a new, international flamboyant style with the construction of a new cathedral at Prague (1344–) under the direction of Peter Parler. This model of rich and variegated tracery and intricate reticulated rib-vaulting was definitive in the Late Gothic of continental Europe, emulated not only by the collegiate churches and cathedrals, but by urban parish churches which rivalled them in size and magnificence. The minster at Ulm and other parish churches like the Heilig-Kreuz-Münster at Schwäbisch Gmünd (c.1320–), St Barbara's Church at Kutná Hora (1389–), and the Heilig-Geist-Kirche (1407–) and St Martin's Church (c.1385–) in Landshut are typical. Use of ogees was especially common.

The flamboyant style was characterised by the multiplication of the ribs of the vaults, with new purely decorative ribs, called tiercons and liernes, and additional diagonal ribs. One common ornament of flamboyant in France is the arc-en-accolade, an arch over a window topped by a pinnacle, which was itself topped with fleuron, and flanked by other pinnacles. Examples of French flamboyant building include the west façade of Rouen Cathedral, and especially the façades of Sainte-Chapelle de Vincennes (1370s) and choir Mont-Saint-Michel's abbey church (1448).

In England, ornamental rib-vaulting and tracery of Decorated Gothic co-existed with, and then gave way to, the perpendicular style from the 1320s, with straightened, orthogonal tracery topped with fan-vaulting. Perpendicular Gothic was unknown in continental Europe and unlike earlier styles had no equivalent in Scotland or Ireland. It first appeared in the cloisters and chapter-house (c. 1332) of Old St Paul's Cathedral in London by William de Ramsey. The chancel of Gloucester Cathedral (c. 133757) and its latter 14th century cloisters are early examples. Four-centred arches were often used, and lierne vaults seen in early buildings were developed into fan vaults, first at the latter 14th century chapter-house of Hereford Cathedral (demolished 1769) and cloisters at Gloucester, and then at Reginald Ely's King's College Chapel, Cambridge (14461461) and the brothers William and Robert Vertue's Henry VII Chapel (c. 150312) at Westminster Abbey. Perpendicular is sometimes called Third Pointed and was employed over three centuries; the fan-vaulted staircase at Christ Church, Oxford built around 1640.

Lacey patterns of tracery continued to characterize continental Gothic building, with very elaborate and articulated vaulting, as at St Barbara's, Kutná Hora (1512). In certain areas, Gothic architecture continued to be employed until the 17th and 18th centuries, especially in provincial and ecclesiastical contexts, notably at Oxford.

Decline and transition 
Beginning in the mid-15th century, the Gothic style gradually lost its dominance in Europe. It had never been popular in Italy, and in the mid-15th century the Italians, drawing upon ancient Roman ruins, returned to classical models. The dome of Florence Cathedral (1420–1436) by Filippo Brunelleschi, inspired by the Pantheon, Rome, was one of the first Renaissance landmarks, but it also employed Gothic technology; the outer skin of the dome was supported by a framework of twenty-four ribs.

The Kings of France had first-hand knowledge of the new Italian style, because of the military campaign of Charles VIII to Naples and Milan (1494), and especially the campaigns of Louis XII and Francis I (1500–1505) to restore French control over Milan and Genoa.  They brought back Italian paintings, sculpture and building plans, and, more important, Italian craftsmen and artists. The Cardinal Georges d'Amboise, chief minister of Louis XII, built the Chateau of Gaillon near Rouen (1502–10) with the assistance of Italian craftsmen. The Château de Blois (1515–24) introduced the Renaissance loggia and open stairway. King Francois I installed Leonardo da Vinci at his Chateau of Chambord in 1516, and introduced a Renaissance long gallery at the Palace of Fontainebleau in 1528–1540. In 1546 Francois I began building the first example of French classicism, the square courtyard of the Louvre Palace designed by Pierre Lescot.

In Germany, some Italian elements were introduced at the Fugger Chapel of St Anne's Church, Augsburg, (1510–1512)  combined with Gothic vaults; and others appeared in the Church of St. Michael in Munich, but in Germany Renaissance elements were used primarily for decoration. Some Renaissance elements also appeared in Spain, in the new palace begun by Emperor Charles V in Granada, within the Alhambra (1485–1550), inspired by Bramante and Raphael, but it was never completed. The first major Renaissance work in Spain was El Escorial, the monastery-palace built by Philip II of Spain.

Under Henry VIII and Elizabeth I, England was largely isolated from architectural developments on the continent. The first classical building in England was the Old Somerset House in London (1547–1552) (since demolished), built by Edward Seymour, 1st Duke of Somerset, who was regent as Lord Protector for Edward VI until the young king came of age in 1547. Somerset's successor, John Dudley, 1st Duke of Northumberland, sent the architectural scholar John Shute to Italy to study the style. Shute published the first book in English on classical architecture in 1570. The first English houses in the new style were Burghley House (1550s–1580s) and Longleat, built by associates of Somerset. With those buildings, a new age of architecture began in England.

Gothic architecture survived the early modern period and flourished again in a revival from the late 18th century and throughout the 19th. Perpendicular was the first Gothic style revived in the 18th century.

Structural elements

Pointed arches

The defining characteristic of the Gothic style is the pointed arch, which was widely used in both structure and decoration. The pointed arch did not originate in Gothic architecture; they had been employed for centuries in the Near East in pre-Islamic as well as Islamic architecture for arches, arcades, and ribbed vaults. In Gothic architecture, particularly in the later Gothic styles, they became the most visible and characteristic element, giving a sensation of verticality and pointing upward, like the spires. Gothic rib vaults covered the nave, and pointed arches were commonly used for the arcades, windows, doorways, in the tracery, and especially in the later Gothic styles decorating the façades. They were also sometimes used for more practical purposes, such as to bring transverse vaults to the same height as diagonal vaults, as in the nave and aisles of Durham Cathedral, built in 1093.

The earliest Gothic pointed arches were lancet lights or lancet windows, narrow windows terminating in a lancet arch, an arch with a radius longer than their breadth, (width), and resembling the blade of a lancet. In the 12th century First Pointed phase of Gothic architecture, also called the Lancet style and before the introduction of tracery in the windows in later styles, lancet windows predominated Gothic building.

The Flamboyant Gothic style was particularly known for such lavish pointed details as the arc-en-accolade, where the pointed arch over a doorway was topped by a pointed sculptural ornament called a fleuron and by pointed pinnacles on either side. the arches of the doorway were further decorated with small cabbage-shaped sculptures called "chou-frisés".

Rib vaults

The Gothic rib vault was one of the essential elements that made possible the great height and large windows of the Gothic style. Unlike the semi-circular barrel vault of Roman and Romanesque buildings, where the weight pressed directly downward, and required thick walls and small windows, the Gothic rib vault was made of diagonal crossing arched ribs. These ribs directed the thrust outwards to the corners of the vault, and downwards via slender colonettes and bundled columns, to the pillars and columns below. The space between the ribs was filled with thin panels of small pieces of stone, which were much lighter than earlier groin vaults. The outward thrust against the walls was countered by the weight of buttresses and later flying buttresses. As a result, the massive thick walls of Romanesque buildings were no longer needed; Since the vaults were supported by the columns and piers, the walls could be thinner and higher, and filled with windows.

The earlier Gothic rib vaults, used at Sens Cathedral (begun between 1135 and 1140) and Notre-Dame de Paris (begun 1163), were divided by the ribs into six compartments. They were very difficult to build, and could only cross a limited space. Since each vault covered two bays, they needed support on the ground floor from alternating columns and piers. In later construction, the design was simplified, and the rib vaults had only four compartments. The alternating rows of alternating columns and piers receiving the weight of the vaults was replaced by simple pillars, each receiving the same weight. A single vault could cross the nave. This method was used at Chartres Cathedral (1194–1220), Amiens Cathedral (begun 1220), and Reims Cathedral. The four-part vaults made it possible for the building to be even higher.

Later vaults (13th–15th century) 
In France, the four-part rib vault, with two diagonals crossing at the center of the traverse, was the type used almost exclusively until the end of the Gothic period. However, in England, several imaginative new vaults were invented which had more elaborate decorative features. They became a signature of the later English Gothic styles.

The first of these new vaults had an additional rib, called a tierceron, which ran down the median of the vault. It first appeared in the vaults of the choir of Lincoln Cathedral at the end of the 12th century, then at Worcester Cathedral in 1224, and then the south transept of Lichfield Cathedral.

The 14th century brought the invention of several new types of vaults which were more and more decorative. These vaults often copied the forms form of the elaborate tracery of the Late Gothic styles. These included the stellar vault, where a group of additional ribs between the principal ribs forms a star design. The oldest vaults of this kind were found in the crypt of Saint Stephen at Westminster Palace, built about 1320. A second type was called a reticulated vault, which had a network of additional decorative ribs, in triangles and other geometric forms, placed between or over the traverse ribs. These were first used in the choir of Bristol Cathedral in about 1311. Another late Gothic form, the fan vault, with ribs spreading upwards and outwards, appeared later in the 14th century. An example is the cloister of Gloucester Cathedral (c. 1370).

Another new form was the skeleton vault, which appeared in the English Decorated style. It has an additional network of ribs, like the ribs of an umbrella, which criss-cross the vault but are only directly attached to it at certain points. It appeared in a chapel of Lincoln Cathedral in 1300. and then several other English churches. This style of vault was adopted in the 14th century in particular by German architects, particularly Peter Parler, and in other parts of central Europe. Another exists in the south porch of the Prague Cathedral

Elaborate vaults also appeared in civic architecture. An example is the ceiling of the Vladislav Hall in Prague Castle in Bohemia designed by Benedikt Ried in 1493. The ribs twist and intertwine in fantasy patterns, which later critics called "Rococo Gothic".

Columns and piers

In Early French Gothic architecture, the capitals of the columns were modeled after Roman columns of the Corinthian order, with finely-sculpted leaves. They were used in the ambulatory of the Abbey church of Saint-Denis. According to its builder, the Abbot Suger, they were inspired by the columns he had seen in the ancient baths in Rome. They were used later at Sens, at Notre-Dame de Paris and at Canterbury in England.

In early Gothic churches with six-part rib vaults, the columns in the nave alternated with more massive piers to provide support for the vaults. With the introduction of the four-part rib vault, all of the piers or columns in the nave could have the same design. In the High Gothic period, a new form was introduced, composed of a central core surrounded several attached slender columns, or colonettes, going up to the vaults. These clustered columns were used at Chartres, Amiens, Reims and Bourges, Westminster Abbey and Salisbury Cathedral. Another variation was a quadrilobe column, shaped like a clover, formed of four attached columns. In England, the clustered columns were often ornamented with stone rings, as well as columns with carved leaves.

Later styles added further variations. Sometimes the piers were rectangular and fluted, as at Seville Cathedral, In England, parts of columns sometimes had contrasting colours, using combining white stone with dark Purbeck marble. In place of the Corinthian capital, some columns used a stiff-leaf design. In later Gothic, the piers became much taller, reaching up more than half of the nave. Another variation, particularly popular in eastern France, was a column without a capital, which continued upward without capitals or other interruption, all the way to the vaults, giving a dramatic display of verticality.

Flying buttresses

An important feature of Gothic architecture was the flying buttress, a half-arch outside the building which carried the thrust of weight of the roof or vaults inside over a roof or an aisle to a heavy stone column. The buttresses were placed in rows on either side of the building, and were often topped by heavy stone pinnacles, both to give extra weight and for additional decoration.

Buttresses had existed since Roman times, usually set directly against the building, but the Gothic vaults were more sophisticated. In later structures, the buttresses often had several arches, each reaching in to a different level of the structure. The buttresses permitted the buildings to be both taller, and to have thinner walls, with greater space for windows.

Over time, the buttresses and pinnacles became more elaborate supporting statues and other decoration, as at Beauvais Cathedral and Reims Cathedral. The arches had an additional practical purpose; they contained lead channels which carried rainwater off the roof; it was expelled from the mouths of stone gargoyles placed in rows on the buttresses.

Flying buttresses were used less frequently in England, where the emphasis was more on length than height. One example of English buttresses was Canterbury Cathedral, whose choir and buttresses were rebuilt in Gothic style by William of Sens and William the Englishman. However, they were very popular in Germany: in Cologne Cathedral the buttresses were lavishly decorated with statuary and other ornament, and were a prominent feature of the exterior.

Towers and spires 

Towers, spires and flèches were an important feature of Gothic churches. They presented a dramatic spectacle of great height, helped make their churches the tallest and most visible buildings in their city, and symbolised the aspirations of their builders toward heaven. They also had a practical purpose; they often served as bell towers supporting belfries, whose bells told the time by announcing religious services, warned of fire or enemy attack, and celebrated special occasions like military victories and coronations. Sometimes the bell tower is built separate from a church; the best-known example of this is the Leaning Tower of Pisa.

The towers of cathedrals were usually the last part of the structure to be built. Since cathedral construction usually took many years, and was extremely expensive, by the time the tower were to be built public enthusiasm waned, and tastes changed. Many projected towers were never built, or were built in different styles than other parts of the cathedral, or with different styles on each level of the tower. At Chartres Cathedral, the south tower was built in the 12th century, in the simpler Early Gothic, while the north tower is the more highly decorated Flamboyant style. Chartres would have been even more exuberant if the second plan had been followed; it called for seven towers around the transept and sanctuary.

In the Île-de-France, cathedral towers followed the Romanesque tradition of two identical towers, one on either side of the portals. The west front of the Saint-Denis, became the model for the early Gothic cathedrals and High Gothic cathedrals in northern France, including Notre-Dame de Paris, Reims Cathedral, and Amiens Cathedral.

The early and High Gothic Laon Cathedral has a square lantern tower over the crossing of the transept; two towers on the western front; and two towers on the ends of the transepts. Laon's towers, with the exception of the central tower, are built with two stacked vaulted chambers pierced by lancet openings. The two western towers contain life-size stone statues of sixteen oxen in their upper arcades, said to honour the animals who hauled the stone during the cathedral's construction.

In Normandy, cathedrals and major churches often had multiple towers, built over the centuries; the Abbaye aux Hommes (begun 1066), Caen has nine towers and spires, placed on the façade, the transepts, and the centre. A lantern tower was often placed the centre of the nave, at the meeting point with the transept, to give light to the church below.

In later periods of Gothic, pointed needle-like spires were often added to the towers, giving them much greater height. A variation of the spire was the flèche, a slender, spear-like spire, which was usually placed on the transept where it crossed the nave. They were often made of wood covered with lead or other metal. They sometimes had open frames, and were decorated with sculpture. Amiens Cathedral has a flèche. The most famous example was that of Notre-Dame de Paris. The original flèche of Notre-Dame was built on the crossing of the transept in the middle of the 13th century, and housed five bells. It was removed in 1786 during a program to modernize the cathedral, but was put back in a new form designed by Eugène Viollet-le-Duc. The new flèche, of wood covered with lead, was decorated with statues of the Apostles; the figure of St Thomas resembled Viollet-le-Duc. The flèche was destroyed in the 2019 fire, but is being restored in the same design.

In English Gothic, the major tower was often placed at the crossing of the transept and nave, and was much higher than the other. The most famous example is the tower of Salisbury Cathedral, completed in 1320 by William of Farleigh. It was a remarkable feat of construction, since it was built upon the pillars of the much earlier church. A crossing tower was constructed at Canterbury Cathedral in 1493–1501 by John Wastell, who had previously worked on King's College at Cambridge. It was finished by Henry Yevele, who also built the present nave of Canterbury. The new central tower at Wells Cathedral caused a problem; it was too heavy for the original structure. An unusual double arch had to be constructed in the centre of the crossing to give the tower the extra support it needed.

England's Gothic parish churches and collegiate churches generally have a single western tower. A number of the finest churches have masonry spires, with those of St James Church, Louth; St Wulfram's Church, Grantham; St Mary Redcliffe in Bristol; and Coventry Cathedral. These spires all exceed  in height.

Westminster Abbey's crossing tower has for centuries remained unbuilt, and numerous architects have proposed various ways of completing it since the 1250s, when work began on the tower under Henry III. A century and half later, an octagonal roof lantern resembling that of Ely Cathedral was installed instead, which was then demolished in the 16th century. Construction began again in 1724 to the design of Nicholas Hawksmoor, after first Christopher Wren had proposed a design in 1710, but stopped again in 1727. The crossing remains covered by the stub of the lantern and a 'temporary' roof.

Later Gothic towers in Central Europe often followed the French model, but added even denser decorative tracery. Cologne Cathedral had been started in the 13th century, following the plan of Amiens Cathedral, but only the apse and the base of one tower were finished in the Gothic period. The original plans were conserved and rediscovered in 1817, and the building was completed in the 20th century following the origin design. It has two spectacularly ornamented towers, covered with arches, gables, pinnacles and openwork spires pointing upwards. The tower of Ulm Minster has a similar history, begun in 1377, stopped in 1543, and not completed until the 19th century.

Regional variants of Gothic towers appeared in Spain and Italy. Burgos Cathedral was inspired by Northern Europe. It has an exceptional cluster of openwork spires, towers, and pinnacles, drenched with ornament. It was begun in 1444 by a German architect, Juan de Colonia (John of Cologne) and eventually completed by a central tower (1540) built by his grandson.

In Italy the towers were sometimes separate from the cathedral; and the architects usually kept their distance from the Northern European style. the leaning tower of Pisa Cathedral, built between 1173 and 1372, is the best-known example. The Campanile of Florence Cathedral was built by Giotto in the Florentine Gothic style, decorated with encrustations of polychrome marble. It was originally designed to have a spire.

Tracery 

Tracery is an architectural solution by which windows (or screens, panels, and vaults) are divided into sections of various proportions by stone bars or ribs of moulding. Pointed arch windows of Gothic buildings were initially (late 12th–late 13th centuries) lancet windows, a solution typical of the Early Gothic or First Pointed style and of the Early English Gothic. Plate tracery was the first type of tracery to be developed, emerging in the later phase of Early Gothic or First Pointed. Second Pointed is distinguished from First by the appearance of bar–tracery, allowing the construction of much larger window openings, and the development of Curvilinear, Flowing, and Reticulated tracery, ultimately contributing to the Flamboyant style. Late Gothic in most of Europe saw tracery patterns resembling lace develop, while in England Perpendicular Gothic or Third Pointed preferred plainer vertical mullions and transoms. Tracery is practical as well as decorative, because the increasingly large windows of Gothic buildings needed maximum support against the wind.

Plate tracery, in which lights were pierced in a thin wall of ashlar, allowed a window arch to have more than one light – typically two side by side and separated by flat stone spandrels. The spandrels were then sculpted into figures like a roundel or a quatrefoil. Plate tracery reached the height of its sophistication with the 12th century windows of Chartres Cathedral and in the "Dean's Eye" rose window at Lincoln Cathedral.

At the beginning of the 13th century, plate tracery was superseded by bar-tracery. Bar-tracery divides the large lights from one another with moulded mullions. Stone bar-tracery, an important decorative element of Gothic styles, first was used at Reims Cathedral shortly after 1211, in the chevet built by Jean D'Orbais. It was employed in England around 1240. After 1220, master builders in England had begun to treat the window openings as a series of openings divided by thin stone bars, while before 1230 the apse chapels of Reims Cathedral were decorated with bar-tracery with cusped circles (with bars radiating from the centre). Bar-tracery became common after c.1240, with increasing complexity and decreasing weight. The lines of the mullions continued beyond the tops of the window lights and subdivided the open spandrels above the lights into a variety of decorative shapes. Rayonnant style (c.1230–c.1350) was enabled by the development of bar-tracery in Continental Europe and is named for the radiation of lights around a central point in circular rose windows. Rayonnant also deployed mouldings of two different types in tracery, where earlier styles had used moulding of a single size, with different sizes of mullions. The rose windows of Notre-Dame de Paris (c.1270) are typical.

The early phase of Middle Pointed style (late 13th century) is characterized by Geometrical tracery – simple bar-tracery forming patterns of foiled arches and circles interspersed with triangular lights. The mullions of Geometrical style typically had capitals with curved bars emerging from them. Intersecting bar-tracery (c.1300) deployed mullions without capitals which branched off equidistant to the window-head. The window-heads themselves were formed of equal curves forming a pointed arch and the tracery-bars were curved by drawing curves with differing radii from the same centres as the window-heads. The mullions were in consequence branched into Y-shaped designs further ornamented with cusps. The intersecting branches produced an array of lozenge-shaped lights in between numerous lancet arched lights.Y-tracery was often employed in two-light windows c.1300.

Second Pointed (14th century) saw Intersecting tracery elaborated with ogees, creating a complex reticular (net-like) design known as Reticulated tracery. Second Pointed architecture deployed tracery in highly decorated fashion known as Curvilinear and Flowing (Undulating). These types of bar-tracery were developed further throughout Europe in the 15th century into the Flamboyant style, named for the characteristic flame-shaped spaces between the tracery-bars. These shapes are known as daggers, fish-bladders, or mouchettes.

Third Pointed or Perpendicular Gothic developed in England from the later 14th century and is typified by Rectilinear tracery (panel-tracery). The mullions are often joined together by transoms and continue up their straight vertical lines to the top of the window's main arch, some branching off into lesser arches, and creating a series of panel-like lights. Perpendicular strove for verticality and dispensed with the Curvilinear style's sinuous lines in favour of unbroken straight mullions from top to bottom, transected by horizontal transoms and bars. Four-centred arches were used in the 15th and 16th centuries to create windows of increasing size with flatter window-heads, often filling the entire wall of the bay between each buttress. The windows were themselves divided into panels of lights topped by pointed arches struck from four centres. The transoms were often topped by miniature crenellations. The windows at Cambridge of King's College Chapel (1446–1515) represent the heights of Perpendicular tracery.

Tracery was used on both the interior and exterior of buildings. It frequently covered the façades, and the interior walls of the nave and choir were covered with blind arcades. It also often picked up and repeated the designs in the stained glass windows. Strasbourg Cathedral has a west front lavishly ornamented with bar tracery matching the windows.

Influences upon Gothic architecture 
 
The Gothic style of architecture was strongly influenced by the Romanesque architecture which preceded it; by the growing population and wealth of European cities, and by the desire to express national grandeur. It was also influenced by theological doctrines which called for more light, by technical improvements in vaulting and buttresses that allowed much greater height and larger windows, and by the necessity of many churches to accommodate large numbers of pilgrims.

Elements of Romanesque and Gothic architecture compared

Plans

The plan of Gothic cathedrals and churches was usually based on the Latin cross (or "cruciform") plan, taken from the ancient Roman Basilica.,and from the later Romanesque churches. They have a long nave making the body of the church, where the parishioners worshipped; a transverse arm called the transept and, beyond it to the east, the choir, also known as a chancel or presbytery, that was usually reserved for the clergy. The eastern end of the church was rounded in French churches, and was occupied by several radiating chapels, which allowed multiple ceremonies to go on simultaneously. In English churches the eastern end also had chapels, but was usually rectangular. A passage called the ambulatory circled the choir. This allowed parishioners, and especially pilgrims, to walk past the chapels to see the relics displayed there without disturbing other services going on.

Each vault of the nave formed a separate cell, with its own supporting piers or columns. The early cathedrals, like Notre-Dame, had six-part rib vaults, with alternating columns and piers, while later cathedrals had the simpler and stronger four-part vaults, with identical columns.

Following the model of Romanesque architecture and the Basilica of Saint Denis, cathedrals usual had two towers flanking the west façade. Towers over the crossing were common in England (Salisbury Cathedral), York Minister) but rarer in France.

Transepts were usually short in early French Gothic architecture, but became longer and were given large rose windows in the Rayonnant period. The choirs became more important. The choir was often flanked by a double disambulatory, which was crowned by a ring of small chapels. In England, transepts were more important, and the floor plans were usually much more complex than in French cathedrals, with the addition of attached Lady Chapels, an octagonal Chapter House, and other structures (See plans of Salisbury Cathedral and York Minster below). This reflected a tendency in France to carry out multiple functions in the same space, while English cathedrals compartmentalized them. This contrast is visible in the difference between Amiens Cathedral, with its minimal transepts and semicircular apse, filled with chapels, on the east end, compared with the double transepts, projecting north porch, and rectangular east end of Salisbury and York.

Elevations and the search for height

Gothic architecture was a continual search for greater height, thinner walls, and more light. This was clearly illustrated in the evolving elevations of the cathedrals.

In Early Gothic architecture, following the model of the Romanesque churches, the buildings had thick, solid walls with a minimum of windows in order to give enough support for the vaulted roofs. An elevation typically had four levels. On the ground floor was an arcade with massive piers alternating with thinner columns, which supported the six-part rib vaults. Above that was a gallery, called the tribune, which provided stability to the walls, and was sometimes used to provide seating for the nuns. Above that was a narrower gallery, called the triforium, which also helped provide additional thickness and support. At the top, just beneath the vaults, was the clerestory, where the high windows were placed. The upper level was supported from the outside by the flying buttresses. This system was used at Noyon Cathedral, Sens Cathedral, and other early structures.

In the High Gothic period, thanks to the introduction of the four part rib vault, a simplified elevation appeared at Chartres Cathedral and others. The alternating piers and columns on the ground floor were replaced by rows of identical circular piers wrapped in four engaged columns. The tribune disappeared, which meant that the arcades could be higher. This created more space at the top for the upper windows, which were expanded to include a smaller circular window above a group of lancet windows. The new walls gave a stronger sense of verticality and brought in more light. A similar arrangement was adapted in England, at Salisbury Cathedral, Lincoln Cathedral, and Ely Cathedral.

An important characteristic of Gothic church architecture is its height, both absolute and in proportion to its width, the verticality suggesting an aspiration to Heaven. The increasing height of cathedrals over the Gothic period was accompanied by an increasing proportion of the wall devoted to windows, until, by the late Gothic, the interiors became like cages of glass. This was made possible by the development of the flying buttress, which transferred the thrust of the weight of the roof to the supports outside the walls. As a result, the walls gradually became thinner and higher, and masonry was replaced with glass. The four-part elevation of the naves of early Cathedrals such as Notre-Dame (arcade, tribune, triforium, clerestory) was transformed in the choir of Beauvais Cathedral to very tall arcades, a thin triforium, and soaring windows up to the roof.

Beauvais Cathedral reached the limit of what was possible with Gothic technology. A portion of the choir collapsed in 1284, causing alarm in all of the cities with very tall cathedrals. Panels of experts were created in Sienna and Chartres to study the stability of those structures. Only the transept and choir of Beauvais were completed, and in the 21st century, the transept walls were reinforced with cross-beams. No cathedral built since exceeded the height of the choir of Beauvais.

West Front 

Churches traditionally face east, with the altar at the east, and the west front, or façade, was considered the most important entrance. Gothic façades were adapted from the model of the Romanesque façades. The façades usually had three portals, or doorways, leading into the nave. Over each doorway was a tympanum, a work of sculpture crowded with figures. The sculpture of the central tympanum was devoted to the Last Judgement, that to the left to the Virgin Mary, and that to the right to the Saints honoured at that particular cathedral. In the early Gothic, the columns of the doorways took the form of statues of saints, making them literally "pillars of the church".

In the early Gothic, the façades were characterized by height, elegance, harmony, unity, and a balance of proportions. They followed the doctrine expressed by Saint Thomas Aquinas that beauty was a "harmony of contrasts." Following the model of Saint-Denis and later Notre-Dame de Paris, the façade was flanked by two towers proportional to the rest of the façade, which balanced the horizontal and vertical elements. Early Gothic façades often had a small rose window placed above the central portal. In England the rose window was often replaced by several lancet windows.

In the High Gothic period, the façades grew higher, and had more dramatic architecture and sculpture. At Amiens Cathedral (c. 1220), the porches were deeper, the niches and pinnacles were more prominent. The portals were crowned with high arched gables, composed of concentric arches filled with sculpture. The rose windows became enormous, filling an entirely wall above the central portal, and they were themselves covered with a large pointed arch. The rose windows were pushed upwards by the growing profusion of decoration below. The towers were adorned with their own arches, often crowned with pinnacles. The towers themselves were crowned with spires, often of open-work sculpture. One of the finest examples of a Flamboyant façade is Notre-Dame de l'Épine (1405–1527).

While French cathedrals emphasized the height of the façade, English cathedrals, particularly in earlier Gothic, often emphasized the width. The west front of Wells Cathedral is 146 feet across, compared with 116 feet wide at the nearly contemporary Amiens Cathedral, though Amiens is twice as high. The west front of Wells was almost entirely covered with statuary, like Amiens, and was given even further emphasis by its colors; traces of blue, scarlet, and gold are found on the sculpture, as well as painted stars against the dark background on other sections.

Italian Gothic façades have the three traditional portals and rose windows, or sometimes simply a large circular window without tracery plus an abundance of flamboyant elements, including sculpture, pinnacles and spires. However, they added distinctive Italian elements. as seen in the façades of Siena Cathedral ) and of Orvieto Cathedral, The Orvieto façade was largely the work of a master mason, Lorenzo Maitani, who worked on the façade from 1308 until his death in 1330. He broke away from the French emphasis on height, and eliminated the column statutes and statuary in the arched entries, and covered the façade with colourful mosaics of biblical scenes (The current mosaics are of a later date). He also added sculpture in relief on the supporting contreforts.

Another important feature of the Italian Gothic portal was the sculpted bronze door. The sculptor Andrea Pisano made the celebrated bronze doors for Florence Baptistry (1330–1336). They were not the first; Abbot Suger had commissioned bronze doors for Saint-Denis in 1140, but they were replaced with wooden doors when the Abbey was enlarged. Pisano's work, with its realism and emotion, pointed toward the coming Renaissance.

East end
Cathedrals and churches were traditionally constructed with the altar at the east end, so that the priest and congregation faced the rising sun during the morning liturgy. The sun was considered the symbol of Christ and the Second Coming, a major theme in Cathedral sculpture. The portion of the church east of altar is the choir, reserved for members of the clergy. There is usually a single or double ambulatory, or aisle, around the choir and east end, so parishioners and pilgrims could walk freely easily around east end.

In Romanesque churches, the east end was very dark, due to the thick walls and small windows. In the ambulatory the Basilica of Saint Denis. Abbot Suger first used the novel combination rib vaults and buttresses to replace the thick walls and replace them with stained glass, opening up that portion of the church to what he considered "divine light".

In French Gothic churches, the east end, or chevet, often had an apse, a semi-circular projection with a vaulted or domed roof. The chevet of large cathedrals frequently had a ring of radiating chapels, placed between the buttresses to get maximum light. There are three such chapels at Chartres Cathedral, seven at Notre Dame de Paris, Amiens Cathedral, Prague Cathedral and Cologne Cathedral, and nine at Basilica of Saint Anthony of Padua in Italy. In England, the east end is more often rectangular, and gives access to a separate and large Lady Chapel, dedicated to the Virgin Mary. Lady Chapels were also common in Italy.

Sculpture

Portals and Tympanum 
Sculpture was an important element of Gothic architecture. Its intent was present the stories of the Bible in vivid and understandable fashion to the great majority of the faithful who could not read. The iconography of the sculptural decoration on the façade was not left to the sculptors. An edict of the Second Council of Nicaea in 787 had declared: "The composition of religious images is not to be left to the inspiration of artists; it is derived from the principles put in place by the Catholic Church and religious tradition. Only the art belongs to the artist; the composition belongs to the Fathers."

In Early Gothic churches, following the Romanesque tradition, sculpture appeared on the façade or west front in the triangular tympanum over the central portal. Gradually, as the style evolved, the sculpture became more and more prominent, taking over the columns of the portal, and gradually climbing above the portals, until statues in niches covered the entire façade, as in Wells Cathedral, to the transepts, and, as at Amiens Cathedral, even on the interior of the façade.

Some of the earliest examples are found at Chartres Cathedral, where the three portals of the west front illustrate the three epiphanies in the Life of Christ. At Amiens, the tympanum over the central portal depicted the Last Judgement, the right portal showed the Coronation of the Virgin, and the left portal showed the lives of saints who were important in the diocese. This set a pattern of complex iconography which was followed at other churches.

The columns below the tympanum are in the form of statues of saints, literally representing them as "the pillars of the church." Each saint had his own symbol at his feet so viewers could recognize them; a winged lion meant Saint Mark, an eagle with four wings meant Saint John the Apostle, and a winged bull symbolized Saint Luke... Floral and vegetal decoration was also very common, representing the Garden of Eden; grapes represented the wines of Eucharist.

The tympanum over the central portal on the west façade of Notre-Dame de Paris vividly illustrates the Last Judgement, with figures of sinners being led off to hell, and good Christians taken to heaven. The sculpture of the right portal shows the coronation of the Virgin Mary, and the left portal shows the lives of saints who were important to Parisians, particularly Saint Anne, the mother of the Virgin Mary.

To make the message even more prominent, the sculpture of the tympanum was painted in bright colors. following a system of colours codified in the 12th century; yellow, called gold, symbolized intelligence, grandeur and virtue; white, called argent, symbolized purity, wisdom, and correctness; black, or sable, meant sadness, but also will; green, or sinople, represented hope, liberty and joy; red or gueules (see gules) meant charity or victory; blue or azure symbolised the sky, faithfulness and perseverance; and violet, or pourpre, was the colour of royalty and sovereignty.

In the later Gothic, the sculpture became more naturalistic; the figures were separated from the walls, and had much more expressive faces, showing emotion and personality. The drapery was very skilfully carved. The torments of hell were even more vividly depicted. The late Gothic sculpture at Siena Cathedral, by Nino Pisano, pointing toward the Renaissance, is particularly notable. Much of it is now kept in a museum to protect it from deterioration.

Grotesques and Labyrinths

Besides saints and apostles, the exteriors of Gothic churches were also decorated with sculptures of a variety of fabulous and frightening grotesques or monsters. These included the chimera, a mythical hybrid creature which usually had the body of a lion and the head of a goat, and the strix or stryge, a creature resembling an owl or bat, which was said to eat human flesh. The strix appeared in classical Roman literature; it was described by the Roman poet Ovid, who was widely read in the Middle Ages, as a large-headed bird with transfixed eyes, rapacious beak, and greyish white wings. They were part of the visual message for the illiterate worshippers, symbols of the evil and danger that threatened those who did not follow the teachings of the church.

The gargoyles, which were added to Notre-Dame in about 1240, had a more practical purpose. They were the rain spouts of the church, designed to divide the torrent of water which poured from the roof after rain, and to project it outwards as far as possible from the buttresses and the walls and windows so that it would not erode the mortar binding the stone. To produce many thin streams rather than a torrent of water, a large number of gargoyles were used, so they were also designed to be a decorative element of the architecture. The rainwater ran from the roof into lead gutters, then down channels on the flying buttresses, then along a channel cut in the back of the gargoyle and out of the mouth away from the church.

Many of the statues at Notre-Dame, particularly the grotesques, were removed from the façade in the 17th and 18th century, or were destroyed during the French Revolution. They were replaced with figures in the Gothic style, designed by Eugène Viollet-le-Duc during the 19th-century restoration. Similar figures appear on the other major Gothic churches of France and England.

Another common feature of Gothic cathedrals in France was a labyrinth or maze on the floor of the nave near the choir, which symbolised the difficult and often complicated journey of a Christian life before attaining paradise. Most labyrinths were removed by the 18th century, but a few, like the one at Amiens Cathedral, have been reconstructed, and the labyrinth at Chartres Cathedral still exists essentially in its original form.

Windows and stained glass

Increasing the amount of light in the interior was a primary objective of the founders of the Gothic movement. Abbot Suger described the new kind of architecture he had created in the east end of the Saint-Denis: "a circular ring of chapels, by virtue of which the whole church would shine with the wonderful and uninterrupted light of most luminous windows, pervading the interior beauty."

Religious teachings in the Middle Ages, particularly the writings of Pseudo-Dionysius the Areopagite, a 6th-century mystic whose book, De Coelesti Hierarchia, was popular among monks in France, taught that all light was divine. When the Abbot Suger ordered the reconstruction of choir of the his abbey church at Saint-Denis, he had the builders create seventy windows, admitting as much light as possible, as the means by which the faithful could be elevated from the material world to the immaterial world.

The placement of the windows was also determined by religious doctrine. The windows on the north side, frequently in the shade, had windows depicting the Old Testament. The windows of the east, corresponding to the direction of the sunrise, had images of Christ and scenes from the New Testament.

In the Early Gothic period, the glass was particularly thick and was deeply coloured with metal oxides; cobalt for blue, copper for a ruby red, iron for green, and antimony for yellow. The process of making the windows was described detail by the 12th-century monk known as Theophilus Presbyter. The glass of each colour was melted with the oxide, blown, shaped into small sheets, cracked with a hot iron into small pieces, and assembled on a large table. The details were painted onto the glass in vitreous enamel, then baked in a kiln to fuse the enamel on the glass. The pieces were fit into a framework of thin lead strips, and then put into a more solid frame or iron armatures between the panels. The finished window was set into the stone opening. Thin vertical and horizontal bars of iron, called vergettes or barlotierres, were placed inside the window to reinforce the glass against the wind.

The use of iron rods between the panels of glass and a framework of stone mullions, or ribs, made it possible to create much larger windows. Larger windows also appeared at York Minster (1140–1160) and Canterbury Cathedral (1178–1200)

The stained glass windows were extremely complex and expensive to create. King Louis IX paid for the rose windows in the transept of Notre-Dame de Paris, but other windows were financed by the contributions of the professions or guilds of the city. These windows usually had a panel which illustrated the work of the guild which funded it, such as the drapers, stonemasons, or coopers.

The 13th century saw the introduction of a new kind of window, with grisaille, or white glass, with a geometric pattern, usually joined with medallions of stained glass. These windows allowed much more light into the cathedral, but diminished the vividness of the stained glass, since there was less contrast between the dark interior and bright exterior. Sainte-Chapelle became the model for other chapels across Europe.

The 14th century brought a variety of new colours, and the use of more realistic shading and half-toning. This was done by the development of flashed glass. Clear glass was dipped into coloured glass, then portions of the coloured glass were ground away to give exactly the right shade. In the 15th century, artists began painting directly onto the glass with enamel colours. Gradually the art of glass came closer and closer to traditional painting.
 

One of the most celebrated Flamboyant buildings was the Sainte-Chapelle de Vincennes (1370s), with walls of glass from floor to ceiling. The original glass was destroyed, and is replaced by grisaille glass. King's College Chapel (15th century), also followed the model of walls entirely filled with glass.

The stained glass windows were extremely complex and expensive to create. King Louis IX paid for the rose windows in the transept of Notre-Dame de Paris, while other windows were often financed by the contributions of the professions or guilds of the city. These windows usually incorporated a panel which illustrates the work of the guild which funded it, such as the drapers, stonemasons, or barrel-makers.

In England, the stained glass windows also grew in size and importance; major examples were the Becket Windows at Canterbury Cathedral (1200–1230) and the windows of Lincoln Cathedral (1200–1220). Enormous windows were also an important element of York Minster and Gloucester Cathedral.

Much of the stained glass in Gothic churches today dates from later restorations, but a few, notably Chartres Cathedral and Bourges Cathedral, still have many of their original windows

Rose windows
Rose windows were a prominent feature of many Gothic churches and cathedrals. The rose was a symbol of the Virgin Mary, and they were particularly used in churches dedicated to her, including Notre-Dame de Paris. Nearly all the major Gothic cathedrals had them in the west façade, and many, such as Notre Dame de Paris, Amiens, Chartres, Strasbourg cathedral and Westminster Abbey, had them transepts as well. The designs of their tracery became increasingly complex, and gave their names to two periods; the Rayonnant and the Flamboyant. Two of the most famous Rayonnant rose windows were constructed in the transepts of Notre-Dame in the 13th century.

High Gothic architectural elements, 1180–1230 

 Flying buttresses developed 
 Higher vaults were possible because of the flying buttresses 
 Larger clerestory windows because of the flying buttresses. 
 Clerestory windows had geometric tracery 
 Rose windows became larger, with Geometric tracery 
 The west front of Notre-Dame set a formula adopted by other cathedrals.
 Transept ends had ornate portals like the west front

Rayonnant Gothic architectural elements 1230–1350

 Cathedrals increasingly tall in relation to width, facilitated by the development of complex systems of buttressing 
 Quadripartite vaults over a single bay 
 Vaults in France maintained simple forms but elsewhere the patterns of ribs became more elaborate. 
 Emphasis on the appearance of high internally. 
 Abandonment of fourth stage, either the deep triforium gallery or the shallow tribune gallery, in the internal elevation. 
 Columns of Classical proportion disappear in favour of increasingly tall columns surrounded by clusters of shafts. 
 Complex shafted piers 
 Large windows divided by mullions into several lights (vertical panels) with Geometric tracery in the arch 
 Large rose windows in Geometric or Radiating designs

Flamboyant Gothic architectural elements 1350–1550

 The design of tracery no longer dependent on circular shapes, developed S curves and flame-like shapes.
 Complex vaults with Flamboyant shapes in the ribs, particularly in Spain and Central Europe, but rare in France
 Many rose windows built with Flamboyant tracery, many in France. 
 Large windows of several lights with Flamboyant tracery in the arch 
 The Flamboyant arch, drafted from four centres, used for smaller openings, e.g. doorways and niches. 
 Mouldings of Flamboyant shape often used as non structural decoration over openings, topped by a floral finial (poupée)

Palaces 

The Gothic style was used in royal and papal residences as well as in churches. Prominent examples include the Palais de la Cité the Medieval Louvre, the Chateau de Vincennes in Paris, residences of the French kings, the Doge's Palace in Venice, and the Palace of the Kings of Navarre in Olite (1269–1512). Another is the Palais des Papes (Palace of the Popes), the former Papal residence in Avignon. It was constructed between 1252 and 1364, during the Avignon Papacy. Given the complicated political situation, it combined the functions of a church, a seat of government and a fortress.(
 
The Palais de la Cité in Paris, close to Notre-Dame de Paris, begun in 1119, which was the principal residence of the French kings until 1417. Most of the Palais de la Cité is gone, but two of the original towers along the Seine, of the towers, the vaulted ceilings of the Hall of the Men-at-Arms (1302), (now in the Conciergerie; and the original chapel, Sainte-Chapelle, can still be seen.

The Louvre Palace was originally built by Philippe II of France beginning in 1190 to house the King's archives and treasures, and given machicoulis and features of a Gothic fortress. However, it was soon made obsolete by the development of artillery, and in the 15th century it was remodelled into a comfortable residential palace. While the outer walls retained their original military appearance, the castle itself, with a profusion of spires, towers, pinnacles, arches and gables, became a visible symbol of royalty and aristocracy. The style was copied in chateaux and other aristocratic residences across France and other parts of Europe.

Civic architecture 
	
In the 15th century, following the late Gothic period or flamboyant style, elements of Gothic decoration began to appear in the town halls of northern France, Flanders and the Netherlands. The Rouen Courthouse in Normandy is representative of Flamboyant Gothic in France. The Hôtel de Ville of Compiègne has an imposing Gothic bell tower, featuring a spire surrounded by smaller towers, and its windows are decorated with ornate accolades or ornamental arches. Similarly flamboyant town halls were found in Arras, Douai, and Saint-Quentin, Aisne, and in modern Belgium, in Brussels, Ghent, Bruges, Audenarde, Mons and Leuven.

Gothic civil architecture in Spain includes the Silk Exchange in Valencia, Spain (1482–1548), a major marketplace, which has a main hall with twisting columns beneath its vaulted ceiling.

University Gothic

The Gothic style was adopted in the late 13th to 15th centuries in early English university buildings, with inspiration coming from monasteries and manor houses. The oldest existing example in England is probably the Mob Quad of Merton College at Oxford University, constructed between 1288 and 1378.

The style was further refined by William of Wykeham, Chancellor of England and founder of New College, Oxford, in 1379. His architect, William Wynford, designed the New College quadrangle in the 1380s, which combined a hall, chapel, library, and residences for Fellows and undergraduates. A similar kind of academic cloister was created at Queen's College, Oxford, in the 1140s, likely designed by Reginald Ely.
 
The design of the colleges was influenced not only by abbeys, but also the design of English manor houses of the 14th and 15th century, such as Haddon Hall in Derbyshire. They were was composed of rectangular courtyards with covered walkways which separated the wings. Some colleges, like Balliol College, Oxford, borrowed a military style from Gothic castles, with battlements and crenolated walls.

King's College Chapel, Cambridge is one of the finest examples of the late Gothic style. It was built by King Henry VI, who was displeased by the excessive decoration of earlier styles. He wrote in 1447 that he wanted his chapel "to proceed in large form, clean and substantial, setting apart superfluity of too great curious works of entail and busy moulding." The chapel, built between 1508 and 1515, has glass walls from floor to ceiling, rising to spreading fan vaults designed by John Wastell. The glass walls are supported by large external buttresses concealed at the base by side chapels.

Other European examples include Collegio di Spagna in the University of Bologna, built during the 14th and 15th centuries; the Collegium Carolinum of the Charles University in Prague in Bohemia (c. 1400); the Escuelas mayores of the University of Salamanca in Spain; and the Collegium Maius of the Jagiellonian University in Kraków, Poland.

Military architecture

In the 13th century, the design of the castle evolved in response to contact with the more sophisticated fortifications of the Byzantine Empire and the Islamic world during the Crusades. These new fortifications were more geometric, with a central high tower called a keep which could be defended even if the curtain walls of the castle were breached. The donjon of the Château de Vincennes, begun by Philip VI of France was a good example.

Towers, usually round, were placed at the corners and along the walls in the Phillipienne castle, close enough together to support each other. The walls had two levels of walkways on the inside, a crennellated parapet with merlons, and projecting machicolations from which missiles could be dropped on besiegers. The upper walls also had protected protruding balconies, échauguettes and bretèches, from which soldiers could see what was happening at the corners or on the ground below. In addition, the towers and walls were pierced with arrowslits, which sometimes took the form of crosses to enable a wider field of fire for archers and crossbowmen.

Castles were surrounded by a deep moat, spanned by a single drawbridge. The entrance was also protected by a grill of iron which could be opened and closed. The walls at the bottom were often sloping, and protected with earthen barriers. One good surviving example is the Château de Dourdan, near Nemours.

After the end of the Hundred Years War (1337–1453), with improvements in artillery, the castles lost most of their military importance. They remained as symbols of the rank of their noble occupants; the narrowing openings in the walls were often widened into the windows of bedchambers and ceremonial halls. The tower of the Château de Vincennes became a part-time royal residence until the Palace of Versailles was completed.

Synagogues

Although Christianity played a dominant role in the Gothic sacred architecture, Jewish communities were present in many European cities during the Middle Ages and they also built their houses of prayer in the Gothic style. Unfortunately, most of the Gothic synagogues did not survive, because they were often destroyed in connection with persecution of the Jews (e. g. in Bamberg, Nürnberg, Regensburg, Vienna). One of the best preserved examples of a Gothic synagogue is the Old New Synagogue in Prague which was completed around 1270 and never rebuilt.

Mosques

There are a few mosques in Gothic style. They are Latin Catholic churches converted into mosques.  The conversion implied compromises since Latin churches are oriented towards the East and mosques are oriented towards Mecca.
 The Arap Mosque in Galata, Istanbul, Turkey.
 Fethija Mosque, in Bihać, Bosnia and Herzegovina.
 Lala Mustafa Pasha Mosque, originally Saint Nicholas Cathedral in Famagusta, Cyprus. The minaret was added during Ottoman times and was later adapted to the building's overall Gothic style by British colonial architects.
 Selimiye Mosque, Nicosia, originally Saint Sophia Cathedral, Cyprus.

Decline
Beginning in the 16th century, as Renaissance architecture from Italy began to appear in France and other countries in Europe, the dominance of Gothic architecture began to wane. Nonetheless, new Gothic buildings, particularly churches, continued to be built.

New Gothic churches built in Paris in this period included Saint-Merri (1520–1552) and Saint-Germain l'Auxerrois. The first signs of classicism in Paris churches did not appear until 1540, at Saint-Gervais-Saint-Protais. As construction of this church continued, elements of Renaissance decoration, including the system of classical orders of columns, were added to the design, making it a Gothic-Renaissance hybrid.

The Gothic style began to be described as outdated, ugly and even barbaric. The term "Gothic" was first used as a pejorative description. Giorgio Vasari used the term "barbarous German style" in his 1550 Lives of the Artists to describe what is now considered the Gothic style. In the introduction to the Lives he attributed various architectural features to the Goths whom he held responsible for destroying the ancient buildings after they conquered Rome, and erecting new ones in this style. In the 17th century, Molière also mocked the Gothic style in the 1669 poem La Gloire: "...the insipid taste of Gothic ornamentation, these odious monstrosities of an ignorant age, produced by the torrents of barbarism..." The dominant styles in Europe became in turn Italian Renaissance architecture, Baroque architecture, and the grand classicism of the style Louis XIV.

Survival, rediscovery and revival

Gothic architecture, usually churches or university buildings, continued to be built. Ireland was an island of Gothic architecture in the 17th and 18th centuries, with the construction of Derry Cathedral (completed 1633), Sligo Cathedral (c. 1730), and Down Cathedral (1790–1818) are other examples. In the 17th and 18th century several important Gothic buildings were constructed at Oxford University and Cambridge University, including Tom Tower (1681–82) at Christ Church, Oxford, by Christopher Wren. It also appeared, in a whimsical fashion, in Horace Walpole's Twickenham villa, Strawberry Hill (1749–1776). The two western towers of Westminster Abbey were constructed between 1722 and 1745 by Nicholas Hawksmoor, opening a new period of Gothic Revival.

In England, partly in response to a philosophy propounded by the Oxford Movement and others associated with the emerging revival of 'high church' or Anglo-Catholic ideas during the second quarter of the 19th century, neo-Gothic began to become promoted by influential establishment figures as the preferred style for ecclesiastical, civic and institutional architecture. The appeal of this Gothic revival (which after 1837, in Britain, is sometimes termed Victorian Gothic), gradually widened to encompass "low church" as well as "high church" clients. This period of more universal appeal, spanning 1855–1885, is known in Britain as High Victorian Gothic.

The Palace of Westminster in London by Sir Charles Barry with interiors by a major exponent of the early Gothic Revival, Augustus Welby Pugin, is an example of the Gothic revival style from its earlier period in the second quarter of the 19th century. Examples from the High Victorian Gothic period include George Gilbert Scott's design for the Albert Memorial in London, and William Butterfield's chapel at Keble College, Oxford. From the second half of the 19th century onwards, it became more common in Britain for neo-Gothic to be used in the design of non-ecclesiastical and non-governmental buildings types. Gothic details even began to appear in working-class housing schemes subsidised by philanthropy, though given the expense, less frequently than in the design of upper and middle-class housing.

The middle of the 19th century was a period marked by the restoration, and in some cases modification, of ancient monuments and the construction of neo-Gothic edifices such as the nave of Cologne Cathedral and the Sainte-Clotilde of Paris as speculation of mediaeval architecture turned to technical consideration. London's Palace of Westminster, St Pancras railway station, New York's Trinity Church and St Patrick's Cathedral are also famous examples of Gothic Revival buildings. The style also reached the Far East in the period, for instance the Anglican St John's Cathedral located at the centre of Victoria City in Central, Hong Kong.

Sub Varieties

Styles

French Styles 

 French Gothic
 Early Gothic
 High Gothic
 Rayonnant
 Flamboyant
 Southern French Gothic

Mediterranean Styles 

 Iberian Gothic
 Portuguese Gothic
 Manueline
 Spanish Gothic
 Castilian Gothic
 Levantine Gothic
 Valencian Gothic
 Catalan Gothic
 Balearic Gothic
 Isabelline
 Plateresque
 Italian Gothic
 Lombard Gothic
 Venetian Gothic

Northern Styles 

 English Gothic
 Early English Gothic
 Decorated Gothic
 Perpendicular Gothic
 Low Country Gothic
 Scheldt Gothic
 Mosan Gothic
 Brabantian Gothic
 Czech Gothic
 Sondergotik
 Lithuanian Gothic
 Belarusian Gothic
 Polish Gothic

Chronological Subsets 

 Romano-Gothic
 Gothic Survival
 Neo-Gothic

Type 

 Brick Gothic
 Jettied Buildings
 Gothic Ecclesiastic Architecture
 Architecture of the medieval cathedrals of England
 Gothic Secular Architecture
 Military

Notable Examples

Austria
St. Stephen's Cathedral, Vienna

Belarus
Mir Castle Complex
Muravanka Church
Church of St.Barys And St.Hlieb, Navahradak
Church of St. Michael, Synkavichy
Church of the Holy Trinity, Iškaldź

Belgium
Brussels Town Hall
Brussels Cathedral
Belfry of Bruges
Belfry of Ghent
Tournai Cathedral
Antwerp Cathedral
Leuven Town Hall
Mechelen Cathedral

Croatia
Zagreb Cathedral

Czech Republic
Prague Cathedral
Charles Bridge
Vladislav Hall
Old Town Hall (Prague)

France
Albi Cathedral
Amiens Cathedral
Blois-Vienne Church
Chartres Cathedral
Fontevraud Abbey
Notre-Dame de Paris
Palais des papes
Reims Cathedral
Rouen Cathedral
Saint Denis Basilica
Sainte-Chapelle
Strasbourg Cathedral

Germany
Ulm Minster
Cologne Cathedral
Maulbronn Monastery
Regensburg Cathedral
Freiburg Minster
Bremen Town Hall
Frauenkirche

Hungary
Matthias Church

Italy
Milan Cathedral
Orvieto Cathedral
Siena Cathedral
Naples Cathedral
Doge's palace
Palazzo Pubblico
Palazzo Vecchio
Giotto's Campanile
White Tower (Brixen)

Lithuania
Kaunas Castle
Trakai Peninsula Castle
Trakai Island Castle
Medininkai Castle
Vilnius Upper Castle
Saint Nicholas Church
Vytautas' the Great Church
Kaunas Cathedral Basilica
Church of St. Anne
House of Perkūnas

Netherlands

St. John's Cathedral ('s-Hertogenbosch)
Ridderzaal, The Hague
Grote or Sint-Jacobskerk (The Hague)
Middelburg Town Hall, Middelburg
St. Martin's Cathedral, Utrecht
Nieuwe Kerk (Amsterdam)
Nieuwe Kerk (Delft)
Cathedral of St Bavo, Haarlem
Grote Kerk, Haarlem
City Hall (Haarlem)
Grote Kerk (Breda)
St. Christopher's Cathedral, Roermond
Dinghuis, Maastricht
Oude Kerk (Delft)
Grote Kerk, Dordrecht
Hooglandse Kerk, Leiden
Grote of Sint-Laurenskerk (Rotterdam)
St Eusebius' Church, Arnhem

Norway 
Nidaros Cathedral
Haakon's Hall, Bergenhus

Poland
Kraków Town Hall
Wrocław Town Hall
Gdańsk Town Hall
Old Town City Hall in Toruń
Copernicus House in Toruń
Chojna Town Hall
Frombork Cathedral
Gniezno Cathedral
Wawel Cathedral
Oliwa Cathedral
Pelplin Abbey
Poznań Cathedral
Toruń Cathedral
St. John's Archcathedral, Warsaw
Wrocław Cathedral
Gniew Castle
Kwidzyn Castle
Lidzbark Castle
Malbork Castle
Corpus Christi Collegiate Church in Biecz
Church of the Assumption of the Blessed Virgin Mary in Chełmno
St. Mary's Basilica, Kraków
Basilica of St. James and St. Agnes, Nysa
Collegiate Basilica of the Birth of the Blessed Virgin Mary, Wiślica
St. Mary's Church, Gdańsk
St. Catherine's Church, Gdańsk
St. James the Greater's Church, Toruń
St. Mary's Church, Stargard
Basilica of Holy Trinity, Kraków
Corpus Christi Basilica
St Elizabeth's Church, Wrocław
St Dorothea Church, Wrocław
Collegiate Church of the Holy Cross and St. Bartholomew, Wrocław
Church of St Mary on the Sand
St. Wojciech (Adalbert) Church, Wrocław
St. John the Evangelist's Church, Paczków
Saints Peter and Paul Basilica, Strzegom
Kraków Barbican
Collegium Maius, Kraków
St. Florian's Gate

Portugal 
Jeronimos Monastery
Monastery of Batalha
Monastery of Alcobaça
Evora Cathedral
Carmo Convent
Guarda Cathedral
Lisbon Cathedral
Oporto Cathedral
Silves Cathedral
Cathedral of Funchal
Convent of Christ 
Castle of Leiria 
Sabugal Castle
Castle of Estremoz
Castle of Bragança
Castle of Santa Maria da Feira
Belém Tower
Monastery of Jesus of Setúbal 
Convent of Nossa Senhora da Conceição de Beja
Graça Church
Santa Maria dos Olivais Church
Leça do Balio Monastery
Saint John of Alporão Church
Monastery of Santa Clara-a-Velha
Monastery of São Francisco

Romania
Black Church
Corvin Castle
Saschiz fortified church
Sebeș Lutheran church
Sibiu Lutheran Cathedral
St. Michael's Church, Cluj-Napoca

Spain 
Palace of the Kings of Navarre of Olite
Palau de la Generalitat
Llotja de la Seda
León Cathedral
Burgos Cathedral
Toledo Cathedral
Cathedral of Avila
Palace of the Borgias
Oviedo Cathedral
Valencia Cathedral
Seville Cathedral, the largest Gothic church
Palma Cathedral

Sweden 
Linköping Cathedral
Uppsala Cathedral
Visby Cathedral

Switzerland 
Basel Minster

Slovakia 
St Elisabeth Cathedral
St Martin's Cathedral, Bratislava

United Kingdom 
Canterbury Cathedral
Salisbury Cathedral
Winchester Cathedral
Christ Church, Oxford
Bodlean library
Westminster Abbey
St George's Chapel, Windsor Castle
Ely Cathedral
King's College Chapel, Cambridge
York Minster

See also 

 Architectural history
 Architecture of cathedrals and great churches
 Carpenter Gothic
 Collegiate Gothic in North America
 Gothicmed
 Gothic cathedrals and churches
 List of Gothic architecture
 Mudéjar
 Tented roof

Notes

Citations

Bibliography

 
 
 
 
 
 Clark, W. W.; King, R. (1983). Laon Cathedral, Architecture. Courtauld Institute Illustration Archives. 1. London: Harvey Miller Publishers. .

Further reading
 
 Fletcher, Banister; Cruickshank, Dan, Sir Banister Fletcher's a History of Architecture, Architectural Press, 20th edition, 1996 (first published 1896). . Cf. Part Two, Chapter 14.
 
 
 
 
 
 
 
 Glaser, Stephanie, "The Gothic Cathedral and Medievalism," in: Falling into Medievalism, ed. Anne Lair and Richard Utz. Special Issue of UNIversitas: The University of Northern Iowa Journal of Research, Scholarship, and Creative Activity, 2.1 (2006). (on the Gothic revival of the 19th century and the depictions of Gothic cathedrals in the Arts)
 
 Rudolph, Conrad ed., A Companion to Medieval Art: Romanesque and Gothic in Northern Europe, 2nd ed. (2016)
 Tonazzi, Pascal (2007) Florilège de Notre-Dame de Paris (anthologie), Editions Arléa, Paris, 
 
 
 
 
 
 
 Rivière, Rémi; Lavoye, Agnès (2007). La Tour Jean sans Peur, Association des Amis de la tour Jean sans Peur.

External links

 Mapping Gothic France, a project by Columbia University and Vassar College with a database of images, 360° panoramas, texts, charts and historical maps
 Gothic Architecture Encyclopædia Britannica
  Gutenberg.org, from Project Gutenberg
  Archive.org, from Internet Archive

 
Architectural history
Architectural styles
European architecture

Architecture in England
Architecture in Italy
Medieval French architecture
Catholic architecture
12th-century architecture
13th-century architecture
14th-century architecture
15th-century architecture
16th-century architecture